A collection cost is the cost incurred to collect debt that is owed, a process called debt collection. This could include expenditures for hiring a collection agency. Some contracts and regulations prescribe liquidated damages for collection costs. When collection costs occur, the debtor has pay off debt to get the collector out of collection cost.

References

Debt collection